The Palace of the Counts of Maceda, or Casa del Barón in Pontevedra, Spain, is an original Renaissance pazo dating from the 16th century. It is currently a four-star hotel belonging to the Paradores network.

Location 
It is located in Barón street, in the heart of the old town of Pontevedra, close to the medieval Burgo Bridge.

History 
The building has its origin in a Roman villa. In the 16th century, the building was transformed into a Renaissance pazo. In the 18th century, the building was completely refurbished by the architect Pedro de Monteagudo and it became the property of the illustrious Counts of Maceda. Later, the property was passed on to the Marquis of Figueroa and Atalaya (also a count of Maceda) who filled it with antiques.

In the 19th century, the palace went into decline, and its uninhabited rooms were used as a sea salt warehouse and a school for poor children. It is even said that the building became a Masonic lodge. Later, it was transformed into a place where dozens of families lived. The Baron of Casa Goda, Eduardo de Vera y Navarro, put an end to this decadence, recovering its possessions and restoring much of its former splendour. This is why the Parador de Turismo de Pontevedra is called Casa del Barón.

In the 20th century, the first floor of the palace became the headquarters of the Graduada Álvarez Limeses School and the second floor was used as a house, being the family residence of the directors of this school until 1950, when the Pontevedra City Council became the owner.

The building was refurbished as a luxury hotel managed by the Spanish State, becoming on 15 January 1955 the first National Parador of Turism in Galicia. In 1974 the hotel underwent its first extension and in 2002 a major upgrade worth 2.34 million euros was carried out.

Description 

The pazo stands out for its imposing dimensions and stately ornamentation.

On the outside, there is a neoclassical portico at the entrance to the building. The façade of the building, covered with a frieze of oval shapes, is decorated with coats of arms and is topped by a colonnade of four granite columns. The palace has a crenellated tower added in the 18th century and a stone terrace. It also has a courtyard (originally designed for horses) and a garden.

Inside, there is large stone staircase, a Galician stone fireplace, and other baroque features. There are numerous drawing rooms. The building is decorated with antiques, tapestries, antique paintings, and classical and royal furniture.

Hotel 
The palace is now the Parador de Pontevedra, a 47-room luxury hotel. It is one of the four most popular paradors in Galicia. In 2019, its average annual occupancy rate was 72.75%, only behind the parador of Santiago de Compostela, the Hospital of the Catholic Monarchs.

King Felipe VI, the reigning king of Spain, used to spend the night here during his stay at the Spanish Naval Academy.

Gallery

References

Bibliography

External links 

 Casa del Barón
 Spain Paradors – Casa del Barón

Paradores
Baroque architecture in Spain
Renaissance architecture in Spain
Renaissance architecture
Pontevedra
Buildings and structures in Pontevedra
Baroque architecture in Galicia (Spain)
Renaissance architecture in Galicia (Spain)
Buildings and structures in the Province of Pontevedra
Palaces in Galicia (Spain)
Tourist attractions in Galicia (Spain)